Nicholas Livas (Greek: Νίκος Λίβας; born April 27, 1987) is a Greek-American professional basketball player. He is 1.98 m tall. He plays the small forward position.

Professional career
Livas started playing basketball in US where he stayed until the end of the 2008-09 season. After college, he joined the Norway's premier professional men's basketball league club Tromsø Storm and played with the squad during the 2009-10 season.

In 2010, he joined the big British Basketball League club Glasgow Rocks.

Livas moved to Prievidza for the 2011-12 season. He also played for Chicago Muscle in 2012.

In 2012, he signed with Göttingen where he stayed for 2 seasons and in 2014 he managed to achieve the promotion to the Bundesliga with his team.

In 2015, he signed a one year old deal with Kavala.

References

External links
RealGM.com Profile
Eurobasket.com Profile

1987 births
Living people
American people of Greek descent
BC Prievidza players
BG Göttingen players
American expatriate basketball people in Norway
American expatriate basketball people in Germany
Glasgow Rocks players
Greek expatriate basketball people in Norway
Greek expatriate basketball people in Germany
Greek men's basketball players
Greek people of American descent
Kavala B.C. players
McKendree Bearcats men's basketball players
Olivet Nazarene Tigers men's basketball players
People from Cary, Illinois
Basketball players from Illinois
University of Illinois at Springfield alumni
American men's basketball players
Small forwards
American expatriate basketball people in the United Kingdom
Citizens of Greece through descent
Greek expatriate sportspeople in Scotland
American expatriate basketball people in Slovakia
Greek expatriate sportspeople in Slovakia